Daniel Corral Barrón (born 25 January 1990) is a Mexican gymnast.

Career 
Corral participated at the 2010 Central American and Caribbean Games where he won the silver medal at the team competition and the bronze medal at the vault final. He then competed at the 2011 Pan-American Games, where he achieved two gold medals in the pommel horse and parallel bars finals. He qualified for the 2012 Summer Olympics individual all-around competition, where he placed 4th at the 2012 Gymnastics Olympic Test Event, he also achieved the gold medal in the parallel bars final in the same event.

In 2013 at the Artistic Gymnastics World Championships held in Antwerp he participated and qualified in 2nd place to the Pommel Horse final, where he tied with British gymnast Max Whitlock for the silver medal with a score of 15.633, thereby becoming the first Mexican gymnast to win a medal at the World Championships.

In 2019, although he did not qualify for any finals, he earned a qualification spot to the 2020 Summer Olympics in Tokyo.

References

1990 births
Mexican male artistic gymnasts
Gymnasts at the 2011 Pan American Games
Pan American Games gold medalists for Mexico
Gymnasts at the 2012 Summer Olympics
Gymnasts at the 2016 Summer Olympics
Olympic gymnasts of Mexico
Sportspeople from Baja California
People from Ensenada, Baja California
Living people
Gymnasts at the 2015 Pan American Games
Gymnasts at the 2019 Pan American Games
Medalists at the World Artistic Gymnastics Championships
Pan American Games bronze medalists for Mexico
Pan American Games medalists in gymnastics
Universiade medalists in gymnastics
Central American and Caribbean Games silver medalists for Mexico
Central American and Caribbean Games bronze medalists for Mexico
Competitors at the 2006 Central American and Caribbean Games
Competitors at the 2010 Central American and Caribbean Games
Competitors at the 2014 Central American and Caribbean Games
Universiade silver medalists for Mexico
Central American and Caribbean Games medalists in gymnastics
Medalists at the 2013 Summer Universiade
Medalists at the 2011 Pan American Games
Medalists at the 2015 Pan American Games
Gymnasts at the 2020 Summer Olympics
21st-century Mexican people